Grozon is a commune in the Jura department in Bourgogne-Franche-Comté in eastern France.

History
A concession of coal mines was operating in the village in the second half of the 19th century and in the 1940s.

Population

See also
Communes of the Jura department

References

Communes of Jura (department)